Hyper Shahr Shahin Shahr Futsal Club was an Iranian professional futsal club based in Shahin Shahr.

Season by season
The table below chronicles the achievements of the Club in various competitions.

References 

Futsal clubs in Iran
Sport in Isfahan Province
2017 establishments in Iran
Futsal clubs established in 2017